Allium cyrilli is a plant species native to Greece, Turkey, and to the Apulia region of southeastern Italy.

Allium cyrilli has one egg-shaped bulb wide, fleshy leaves that are U-shaped in cross section. Umbel consists of a large number of flowers crowded together, all with long fleshy pedicels. Scape is robust, up to 100 cm tall. Tepals are pale lavender with prominent green midstripes. These surround a large and conspicuous deep purple ovary with 3 lobes.

References

cyrilli
Garlic
Flora of Italy
Flora of Greece
Flora of Turkey
Plants described in 1827